Matthew Brock may refer to:

Matthew Brock (Picket Fences), eldest son of Jimmy and Jill on the American television show Picket Fences, played by Justin Shenkarow
Matthew Brock (News Radio), character on the American television show NewsRadio, played by Andy Dick
Matt Brock (born 1966), American football player